Fort McCoy is a United States Army installation on  between Sparta and Tomah, Wisconsin, in Monroe County. In 1909, there were two separate camps named Camp Emory Upton and Camp Robinson; in 1926, these camps were joined together to form Camp McCoy. Since its creation in 1909, the post has been used primarily as a military training center. A part of Fort McCoy is also used by the Wisconsin State Patrol as a training facility.

History
The post has been in virtually constant use since it was first formed as the "Sparta Maneuver Tract" on 14,000 acres (57 km2) in 1909. At first, the tract was made up of two camps, Camp Emory Upton and Camp Robinson. These were separated by a line of the Chicago, Milwaukee, St. Paul and Pacific Railroad that ran across the land from east to west. In 1910, the army renamed the entire tract "Camp Bruce Elisha McCoy" for the father (a Civil War captain) of Robert Bruce McCoy, a retired major general who first proposed the area as a training ground and bought part of the property on which the fort stands. In 1926, the name of the post was officially renamed "Camp McCoy" in honor of Robert Bruce McCoy, who had died in January of that year. It has gone by many different names such as Sparta Maneuver Tract; Sparta Military Reservation; Camp McCoy; and now the present, Fort McCoy. The name McCoy comes from Robert B. McCoy who was a military man, farmer and served as county judge who initially set up the land as a military camp.

In 1938, the United States began a major expansion of the camp. This included the addition of over 45,000 acres (180 km2) to the post, as well as the construction of several new structures, including living quarters for the troops. This increased the camp's capacity to 35,000 soldiers. In all, the project was estimated to have cost about $30 million. The expansion was officially concluded with a new inauguration on August 30, 1942.

During World War II, Fort McCoy was used as a concentration camp for approximately 170 Japanese and 120 German and Italian American civilians arrested as potentially dangerous "enemy aliens" in 1942. After the internees were transferred to other camps, McCoy was used as a training facility for units from across the country preparing to enter combat, including the segregated all-Nisei 100th Infantry Battalion. The post was also used as a prisoner-of-war (POW) camp during the conflict, holding 4,000 Japanese and German POWs. Fort McCoy's POWs were featured in the 2011 film Fort McCoy.

The camp was briefly deactivated following World War II, but with the advent of the Korean War in 1950, it was once again used for training. This continued until 1953, when the camp was again deactivated. It was then used to house various small national, state and civilian projects, and served as a training center for the Army Reserves, the National Guard, and the Job Corps.

In 1973, the Army reactivated Camp McCoy as a permanent training center, and on September 30, 1974, it was officially re-designated as Fort McCoy.

In the 1990s, a second major construction project was undertaken, costing about $140 million. Today, Fort McCoy serves as a Total Force Training Center. More than 100,000 members of the military are trained at the fort every year, and the total number has exceeded 149,000 in the past.

After the fall of Afghanistan to the Taliban in 2021, Fort McCoy hosted one of the largest populations of Afghan evacuees with over 12,600 as of October 2021.

The 181st Infantry Brigade is the largest unit stationed at Fort McCoy. The brigade is responsible for training selected U.S. Army Reserve and Army National Guard units in the Central-Northern United States to support contingency operations in the Global War on Terror.

Deployments
Fort McCoy was used as a mobilization station during Operation Desert Shield and Operation Desert Storm. This was the first time units had mobilized at Fort McCoy since the Korean War. Seventy-four military units deployed through Fort McCoy, totaling more than 9,000 Soldiers, 8% of the reserve forces activated during the Persian Gulf War. Volk Field Air National Guard Base was used as the primary point of departure. In addition, more than 3,000 pieces of equipment were deployed from Fort McCoy by train.

The 769th Engineer Battalion and the 927th Engineer Company (Sapper) of the 225th Engineer Brigade of the Louisiana Army National Guard mobilized for deployments to both Iraq and Afghanistan in 2008 and 2009. The 890th Engineer Battalion of the Mississippi Army National Guard conducted Mobilization training at McCoy from April to June 2008 before deploying to Iraq. The 194th Engineer Brigade mobilized from Fort McCoy to Iraq in 2009 and 190th Engineer Company mobilized to Afghanistan from there in 2010, both are part of the Tennessee Army National Guard. In late 2009 the 105th Engineer Battalion of the North Carolina Army National Guard completed its predeployment training and deployed to Kandahar, Afghanistan in early 2010 in support of the 2009-2010 surge in Afghanistan ordered by President Obama.

During February and March 2003, the Wisconsin Army National Guard's 229th Engineer Company (Combat Support Equipment) deployed from Fort McCoy in support of Operation Iraqi Freedom.

From December 2003 through February 2004, the 458th Engineer Battalion (Combat) of Johnstown, Pennsylvania, mobilized through Fort McCoy. One of the soldiers mobilized was an intra-Reserve transfer or "fill" from Boise, Idaho, who later used his experiences there to form a major chapter in the online webcomic BOHICA Blues. The entirety of Chapter 3, "Mobe Station", takes place at Fort McCoy and the surrounding area of Sparta and Tomah.

Exercises and training
Fort McCoy hosts large-scale exercises multiple times each year: a WAREX (Warrior Exercise) focused on platoon level training, and a CSTX (Combat Support Training Exercise) that focus on Company level training. During both exercises, battalion and brigade headquarters exercise their mission command functions to the units participating in the exercises.

The installation also hosts Global Medic, an annual joint-field training exercise designed to replicate all aspects of theater combat medical support, and Operation Cold Steel, a major initiative to improve the Army Reserve's gunnery training, from February through May 2018. These exercises are organized by the 86th Training Division and facilitated by the Observer/Controller-Trainers of the 181st Infantry Brigade.

Between December and March, the Cold Weather Operations Course (CWOC) trains personnel to operate specialized military equipment under winter conditions.  This course is open to the regular Army, Army National Guard, and Army Reserve soldiers as well as Navy, Marine, and Air Force personnel.

Prisoners of war 
Fort McCoy housed many prisoners of war and is known to have held the most Japanese POWs during the war. About 3,000 German, 2,700 Japanese, and 500 Korean prisoners of war were held there. There were many other places that these prisoners were housed. President Franklin D. Roosevelt issued an executive order titled Order 9066 that brought these prisoners into the different states and away from the coasts. The first Japanese prisoner of war to enter the camp was captured at Pearl Harbor.

There were five different POW compounds at Fort McCoy. There were two for the Japanese, another two for the Germans, and one for the Koreans. There were two barracks in each compound consisting of 50 bunk beds This is where they would sleep, spend time with one another and write home if they wanted.

Japanese POWs were served steamed rice, usually once a day, and they were offered soy sauce with all their meals. Their utensils were replaced with chopsticks. Prisoners at Fort McCoy were fed well compared to other camps that were criticized for how they treated Japanese POWs

Health was important factor to Fort McCoy. They had an on-site hospital that POWs could use if they were ill and had access to prescription medicines and the camp dentist.

They were allowed to practice religion freely. Japanese POWs were given a chapel which was converted to a place of worship. Buddhist preaching was performed daily and in order to perform them prisoners needed incense. They did not have incense so they asked the YMCA for it and it was granted to them.

References

External links

 
 Description at GlobalSecurity.org

1909 establishments in Wisconsin
Buildings and structures in Monroe County, Wisconsin
Forts in Wisconsin
United States Army posts